John Hyde may refer to:

Politicians
John Hyde (Australian federal politician) (born 1936), federal politician from Western Australia for the Division of Moore
John Hyde (Australian state politician) (born 1957), state politician from Western Australia for the seat of Perth
John Hyde (Irish politician), UK MP for the Irish constituency of Youghal 1820–1826
John Hyde (MP for Hereford), in 1563, MP for Hereford
John Richard Hyde (1912–2003), Canadian provincial politician

Others
John Hyde (footballer) (1930–2020), Australian rules footballer who played for Geelong
John Hyde (judge) (1738–1796), judge on the Supreme Court of Judicature at Fort William in 1774–96 and author of Hyde's Notebooks
John Kenneth Hyde (1930–1986), English historian
John Nelson Hyde (1865–1912), American missionary
Johnny Hyde (1895–1950), acting agent, including for Marilyn Monroe
John Hyde, Jr., anti-Mormon writer and plaintiff in the 1866 case Hyde v Hyde
John W. Hyde (born 1941), television producer
John Hyde (cricketer) (1827–?), English cricketer

See also
Jack Hyde (disambiguation)